"The Killer in Me" is a 2003 episode of Buffy the Vampire Slayer.

The Killer in Me may also refer to:

The Killer in Me, a 2009 album by Amy Speace, or the title track
The Killer In Me, 2007 ITV1 show featuring Toby Anstis, Fiona Phillips, footballer John Barnes

See also
The Killer Inside Me (disambiguation)